Zuzana Tomas (born 15 February 1977, in Brezno), is a Slovak marathon runner. Tomas competed at 2008 Summer Olympics, where she finished 67th in 2:49:39, about ten minutes behind her personal record (2:39:26). Tomas's coach is Aleksandar Tomas.

Tomas received her PhD in linguistics from the University of Utah in Salt Lake City, Utah, United States. She is currently an assistant professor in the World Languages department at Eastern Michigan University in Ypsilanti, Michigan, United States.

External links
 Zuzana Tomas' olympic games blog
 Zuzana Tomas finishes Women's Marathon 
 Article about Zuzana Tomas
 Slovakia at the 2008 Summer Olympics
 Eastern Michigan University Board of Regents approve 28 new faculty 

1977 births
Living people
Olympic athletes of Slovakia
University of Utah alumni
Eastern Michigan University faculty
Sportspeople from Brezno
Slovak female long-distance runners
Slovak female marathon runners
Athletes (track and field) at the 2008 Summer Olympics